Aare Heinvee (born 27 September 1956) is an Estonian politician. He has been member of XII Riigikogu.

He is a member of Estonian Reform Party.

References

1956 births
Living people
Estonian Reform Party politicians
Mayors of places in Estonia
Members of the Riigikogu, 2011–2015
Estonian University of Life Sciences alumni
People from Rapla